Allahganj is a town and a nagar panchayat in Shahjahanpur district  in the state of Uttar Pradesh, India

About 
Nearest Railway Station- Farrukhabad

Nearest Airport- Bareilly

Major Schools/Colleges:-  Swami Vivekanand Inter College, NGS Degree College, Ramnath Mishra High School, Th.AS Inter College, RK Private ITI Hullapur Allahganj.

Demographics

 Male: 15,363
 Female: 10,032
 Total Population: 25,400
 total votes: 13995

Literacy
 Male : 61.62%
 Female: 39.38%
 Total Literacy: 58.07%

Culture

Festivals
Every year, in September or October during the festival of Navratri, many associations and organisations hold a Ramlila event which has been conducted for over 50 years.

Eid ul-Fitr
The holy festival of Ramadan consists of month-long fasting. It is believed that fasting makes a man give up his vices which bring him closer to Allah. Muslims form an essential part of cultural strata in India hence Eid is celebrated with holy fasting and offering prayers. It ends with joyful feasting.

Rakshabandhan
The festival commemorates the bond between a brother and his sister. Sisters tie Rakhi on their brothers' wrist to protect them against any evil influences. The brothers bring gifts for their sisters and promise the necessary protection for a lifetime. The festival is widely celebrated in every state of India. It strengthens the love between the two.

Janmashtami
The annual Hindu festival celebrates the birth of Lord Krishna.

Diwali
The country celebrates the return of Lord Rama to Ayodhya after an exile of 14 years in the form of lighting diyas, drawing rangolis, decorating houses, wearing new clothes, distributing gifts and burning crackers.
many more...

References

Cities and towns in Shahjahanpur district